Joan Thomas (born 1949) is a Canadian novelist and book reviewer from Winnipeg, Manitoba.

Thomas grew up in Carberry, Manitoba and later worked as a freelance journalist and book reviewer for The Globe and Mail, the Winnipeg Free Press and Prairie Fire, and as a book editor for Turnstone Press. She won a National Magazine Award in 1996 for her journalism.

Thomas's debut novel Reading by Lightning won the 2009 Commonwealth Writers' Prize for Best First Book (Canada/Caribbean) as well as the Amazon.ca First Novel Award.

Her second novel, Curiosity, was nominated for the Scotiabank Giller Prize, the Margaret Laurence Award for Fiction, and the McNally Robinson Book of the Year Award. Both novels were longlisted for the International  Dublin Literary Award.

Her third novel The Opening Sky (2014) was shortlisted for the Governor General's Award for English-language fiction, the Carol Shields Book Award, and the Margaret Laurence Award for Fiction. It won the McNally Robinson Book of the Year Award, and was named a CBC book of the year.

In 2014, Thomas was awarded the Writers' Trust Engel/Findley Award for a mid-career writer.

In 2019, her novel Five Wives won the Governor General's Award for English-language fiction.

Bibliography

Novels
Reading by Lightning, 2008 (Goose Lane Editions)
Curiosity, 2010 (McClelland & Stewart)
The Opening Sky, 2014 (McClelland & Stewart)
Five Wives, 2019 (HarperCollins)

References

21st-century Canadian novelists
Canadian literary critics
Canadian book editors
Canadian women editors
Canadian journalists
Canadian women journalists
Canadian women novelists
Writers from Winnipeg
Writers from Manitoba
Living people
Canadian women short story writers
Canadian women literary critics
21st-century Canadian women writers
20th-century Canadian short story writers
20th-century Canadian women writers
21st-century Canadian short story writers
Canadian women non-fiction writers
1949 births
Governor General's Award-winning fiction writers
Amazon.ca First Novel Award winners